Urolepis may refer to:
 Urolepis (plant), a flowering plant genus in the family Asteraceae
 Urolepis (wasp), a wasp genus in the family Pteromalidae